The Three Sounds (also known as The 3 Sounds) were an American jazz piano trio that formed in 1956 and disbanded in 1973.

The band formed in Benton Harbor, Michigan, United States, as the Four Sounds. The original line-up consisted of Gene Harris on piano, Andrew Simpkins on double bass and Bill Dowdy on drums, along with saxophonist Lonnie "The Sound" Walker, who dropped out the following year. The group moved to Washington and then New York, where, as the Three Sounds, they cut a record for Riverside Records, before signing an exclusive contract with Blue Note.

Between 1958 and 1962, the group released nine albums for Blue Note. They toured nationally during this period, building a large following in jazz clubs across the country. The trio played and recorded with the likes of saxophonists Lester Young, Lou Donaldson, Stanley Turrentine and Sonny Stitt, cornet player Nat Adderley, singer Anita O'Day, and guitarist Bucky Pizzarelli, among others.

Samples in hip hop
The Three Sounds song "Put On Train", from the 1971 Gene Harris album The 3 Sounds was featured as the prominent background sample in the hip hop group Beastie Boys song "What Comes Around" on their 1989 album Paul's Boutique. It previously stated here that this sample came from the Three Sounds album Live at the It Club, recorded in 1970, however this was not released (on Live at the It Club Vol. 2) until 2000.

Discography
1958: Introducing the 3 Sounds (Blue Note)
1958: Introducing the 3 Sounds Vol. 2 (Blue Note)
1958: Branching Out (Riverside) with Nat Adderley
1959: Bottoms Up! (Blue Note)
1959: LD + 3 (Blue Note) with Lou Donaldson
1959: Good Deal (Blue Note)
1960: Moods (Blue Note)
1960: Feelin' Good (Blue Note)
1960: It Just Got to Be (Blue Note)
1960: Blue Hour (Blue Note) with Stanley Turrentine
1961: Here We Come (Blue Note)
1961: Hey There (Blue Note)
1961: Babe's Blues (Blue Note)
1962: Out of This World (Blue Note)
1962: Black Orchid (Blue Note)
1959/62: Standards (Blue Note) released 1998
1962: Blue Genes (Verve)
1963: Anita O'Day & the Three Sounds (Verve) with Anita O'Day
1963: The Three Sounds Play Jazz on Broadway (Mercury)
1963: Some Like It Modern (Mercury)
1964: Live at the Living Room (Mercury)
1964: Three Moods (Limelight)
1965: Beautiful Friendship (Limelight)
1966: Today's Sounds (Limelight)
1966: Vibrations (Blue Note)
1967: Live at the Lighthouse (Blue Note)
1968: Coldwater Flat (Blue Note)
1968: Elegant Soul (Blue Note)
1969: Soul Symphony (Blue Note)
1970: Live at the 'It Club' (Blue Note) - released 1996
1970: Live at the 'It Club' Volume 2 (Blue Note)  - released 2000
1971: The 3 Sounds (Blue Note) - actually a Gene Harris 'solo' album
()

References

External links
Hard Bop Homepage entry

American jazz ensembles from Michigan
Blue Note Records artists
Mercury Records artists
Musical groups from Michigan
Jazz musicians from Michigan
1956 establishments in Michigan